Han Hye-ri (born August 24, 1997) is a South Korean singer and actress. She is known as a former contestant of Produce 101 and as a member of the girl group I.B.I.

Early life
Han Hye-ri was born on August 24, 1997 in Gwangmyeong, Gyeonggi Province, South Korea. She graduated from Sinseo High School and is currently on leave of absence from studies at Paekche Institute of the Arts.

Career

2016: Produce 101 and I.B.I 
In 2016, Han represented Star Empire Entertainment on Produce 101, a show where the final 11 contestants formed the girl group I.O.I. In the final episode, she was ranked in 12th place. Despite not making the final group, she went on to receive offers to appear in several commercials and became a cosmetic spokesmodel for Delight18. In May, Star Empire Entertainment announced that she would be debuting as a member of the group OMZM.

In August 2016, she joined LOEN Entertainment's project group IBI. The group released the digital single "Molae Molae" on August 18. On August 19, I.B.I held a guerrilla concert 'Run to You' at Dongdaemun Design Plaza. On September 22, I.B.I travelled to Bangkok to film their reality show Hello I.B.I.

2017: Acting debut and departure from Star Empire Entertainment 
In 2017, Han played Yeri in the drama The Idolmaster KR. On January 3, she signed a contract as an artist with Star Empire, but she left the agency on July 25.

On December 22, 2017 on her Instagram (hye_9.9) posted pictures of her modeling with MOREBME www.instagram.com/moreme_official first was uploaded by Hyeri herself, the second on moreme's Instagram account.

Discography

Singles

Filmography

Television

Drama

Reality

References

External links

 Han Hye-ri on Instagram

South Korean women pop singers
South Korean female idols
South Korean television personalities
Kakao M artists
Produce 101 contestants
South Korean television actresses
1997 births
Living people
21st-century South Korean women singers
21st-century South Korean singers
21st-century South Korean actresses